Facing the Music is a 1941 British comedy film directed by Maclean Rogers and starring Bunny Doyle, Betty Driver, Chili Bouchier and H. F. Maltby.

Plot
An incompetent man struggles to hold down a series of jobs.

Cast
 Bunny Doyle - Wilfred Hollebone
 Betty Driver - Mary Matthews
 H. F. Maltby - Mr. Bulger
 Chili Bouchier - Anna Braun
 Wally Patch - Briggs
 Gus McNaughton - Illusionist
 Ruby Miller - Gloria Lynn
 Eliot Makeham - Secretary
 Gordon McLeod - Mr. Kelly

References

External links

1941 films
1941 comedy films
Films directed by Maclean Rogers
British comedy films
British black-and-white films
1940s English-language films
1940s British films
English-language comedy films